Françoise Pascal was born (14 October 1949) in Mauritius to French parents. She is a British actress, singer, dancer, fashion model, and producer born. She appeared in numerous film and television productions in her peak throughout the late 1960s to early 1980s. Film roles include two films with Peter Sellers, There’s A Girl In My Soup (1970) and Soft Beds, Hard Battles (1973). Her career further advanced with appearances in Burke & Hare (1972), La Rose De Fer (1973), and Keep It Up Downstairs (1976). Her greatest success was on the hit British sitcom Mind Your Language as Danielle Favre. She also became established as a sex symbol as Penthouse Pet of the Month for August 1970, and appearing on the first cover of Club International in 1972.

Early life
Pascal was born in Mauritius colony of the United Kingdom, to Marcel and Claire Pascal. She grew up with her parents and four siblings in Mauritius, until age 6 when her family moved to London. She also lived in Paris for some time where she attended La Sorbonne. Her father died when she was 14.

Career

Acting
Represented by Hazel Malone Management, her earliest films were Norman J. Warren's Loving Feeling and Pete Walker's School for Sex (both 1969), and she also appeared briefly in a scene in the troubled cult horror film Incense for the Damned (1970). However, her breakthrough role was playing Paola in There's a Girl in My Soup (1970) with Peter Sellers. She went on to do the black comedy Burke & Hare. (1972), playing Marie, and another Sellers film, Soft Beds, Hard Battles (1974).

After that appearance, she moved to France where she starred in such films as Et situ n'en Vex Pas (1974) and Les Raisins de la Mort (1978), directed by Jean Rollin. The producer of Rolling's La Rose de Fer, then gave her the lead in the film but it was not a success. Later she returned to England to appear in Keep It Up Downstairs (1976) alongside Diana Dors, Jack Wild and Mary Millington.

Her first television work came in October 1971 with a role in Coronation Street, playing Ray Langton's friend. Then came guest starring roles in an episode of Play of the Month for the BBC in "Don Quixote" (1973) with Rex Harrison and for ITV's Sunday Night Theatre "Giants & Ogres" (1971). She was cast in numerous guest starring appearances in many television comedy series such as Happy Ever After (1976) with Terry Scott and June Whitfield, as well as My Honourable Mrs (1975) with Derek Nimmo for the BBC. She co-starred in an episode of the thriller You're on Your Own starring Denis Quilley, for the BBC.

She played seductive French au-pair Danielle Favre in the first three series of the ITV sitcom Mind Your Language (1977–79); she then took on her stage roles in Happy Birthday (reuniting with Frazer Hines), and starring in a pantomime of Aladdin. Pascal left for the United States in 1980, where she acted in Hollywood with a two-year contract in The Young and the Restless, Gavillan, My Man Adam, Lightning, The White Stallion. She returned to England in 1987.

In 2015, Pascal joined the cast for a new comedy series called For the Love of Ella. The series also stars Ewen Macintosh, Lucy Drive, Bobby Ball, Alex Reid, Daniel Peacock, Melanie Sykes, Darren Day and Billy Pearce.

Since work had been scarce as an actress for some years, Pascal has turned her talent to producing her first film Cold Sun starring Patrick Bergin and Ian Ogilvy. The film is produced by Pascal's own company MFC Productions Ltd and Pascal Productions Ltd. She is also to make an appearance in the film.

Music
Pascal made her music debut in August 1968 with the UK release of her promo double single When It Comes to Love / Got It Badly. Released on SNB Records UK, the ballad-driven songs received good reviews from critics, but failed to make a commercial impact. With her acting career taking off, Pascal pursued acting full time and didn’t return to the music scene for over a decade. 

In 1979, Pascal returned to the music industry with record executives hoping to cash in on her burgeoning success from Mind Your Language. Signed to RCA Victor UK, she released her biggest music hit to date, Woman Is Free, as a promo single along with Symphony Just For Me. Released only in the United Kingdom, Woman Is Free achieved modest success and was a bop hit in disco clubs. The popularity of the song continued when it was covered by Grace Kennedy for her debut album Desires the following year. 

The moderate success of Woman Is Free propelled RCA UK to release Pascal’s next single I Can’t Get Enough in 1981. The synth pop/soul inspired song, along with the singles second track Make Love To Me, failed to find success on the music charts. Subsequently Pascal was dropped from the label without releasing a full length studio album. 

Since 1981, Pascal has remained mostly inactive in the music industry. As of 2020, her catalogue of music is out of print, and physical copies of the vinyl singles are hard to find. Although her music has yet to be remastered and released on music streaming platforms, Pascal does feature her entire collection of songs on her official website.

Filmography

Film

Television

Discography

Personal life
Pascal had a child, Nicholas Johnson, with actor Richard Keith Johnson.

On 4 December 2010, she joined Rolling Stones guitarist Ronnie Wood at Claygate Village to turn on the village Christmas lights and singing a solo of Silent Night.

In December 2012, Pascal took part in the ITV1 programme Storage Hoarders, in which she sorted and sold at auction some of her more valuable possessions which she had kept in storage for months.

One of Pascal’s closest friends was British actress, Lynne Frederick. She first became acquainted with Frederick in 1972, when they co-starred on an episode of the television anthology series, BBC Play of the Month. The two actresses quickly became “firm friends” and frequently saw each other during the height of their careers in the 1970s. Pascal recalled that they regretfully lost contact in 1977 after Frederick married Peter Sellers. Frederick later died in 1994. In April 2020, a few weeks before the 26th anniversary of Frederick’s death, Pascal tweeted a photo of herself and Frederick, with the caption “I think of her very often! Always had that fresh baby face! RIP Lynne! Xxx”.

References

Further reading
 As I Am Autobiography Information, Published by Pegasus Elliot McKenzie 2012
 Simon Sheridan Keeping the British End Up: Four Decades of Saucy Cinema (2011) (fourth edition) (Titan Publishing, London)

External links
 
 
 2010 interview
 For the Love of Ella at IMDb

1949 births
British film actresses
British television actresses
People from Plaines Wilhems District
Mauritian people of French descent
Mauritian emigrants to the United Kingdom
Living people
Penthouse Pets
20th-century British actresses
21st-century British actresses